Eupithecia spilocyma is a moth in the family Geometridae. It is found on the Philippines (Luzon).

References

Moths described in 1931
spilocyma
Moths of Asia